Jacques Marquet de Montbreton, baron de Norvins (Paris, 18 June 1769 - Paris, 30 July 1854) was a French politician and writer, also a soldier, lawyer and administrator.  Born into a wealthy family of tax farmers, after Napoleon came to power, Norvins became and remained a firm supporter, serving as Napoleon's Chief of Police in French-occupied Rome from 1810-14.

Ingres portrait
A portrait of Jacques de Norvins in the National Gallery, London was painted by Ingres in 1811–12, when the sitter was Napoleon's Chief of Police in Rome. Originally, instead of the curtain at the left, there was a fully painted bust of a boy's head on top of a small column.  Probably this was a bust of Napoleon's son, who was known as the King of Rome. The presumption is that this was overpainted with the curtain after the fall of Napoleon, either by Ingres himself, or another artist.  The bust can just be made out in the enlarged online photo, with its chin level with the sitter's hair-line; the top of the column was level with the middle of the sitter's ear.  These may always have been (just) visible, or have become so by the paint becoming transparent with age.  Few viewers of the painting would notice the bust without it being pointed out.  Strictly speaking, these alterations might not be described as pentimenti, because of the presumed lapse of time, and because another artist may have made the change.

Works
 Les Ruines et les monuments, poème dithyrambique, 1806
 Sur la guerre actuelle et ses résultats, 31 May 1815
 De l'intérêt de l'époque actuelle, 1819
 Tableau de la Révolution française, depuis son origine jusqu'en 1814, 1819
 L'Immortalité de l'âme, ou les Quatre âges religieux, poème en 4 chants, 1822
 Portefeuille de 1813, ou Tableau politique et militaire renfermant, avec le récit des événements de cette époque, un choix de la correspondance inédite de l'empereur Napoléon et de celle de plusieurs personnages distingués, soit français, soit étrangers, pendant la première campagne de Saxe, l'armistice de Plesswitz, le congrès de Prague et la seconde campagne de Saxe, 1825
 Histoire de Napoléon, 1827

He was also (with Arnault, Jay and Jouy) one of the authors of the Biographie des Contemporains.

References

Sources
 
 Georges Hartmann, L'Hôtel, rue d'Anjou, où mourut La Fayette, Extrait du Bulletin de la Société historique et archéologique des VIIIe et XVIIe arrondissements, Paris, Librairie ancienne Édouard Champion, 1921, pp. 23–24

French politicians
1769 births
1854 deaths
French male writers